Captain Charles Goodall (1824–1899) was an American businessman and politician. Along with George Clement Perkins and Nelson, he founded the Pacific Coast Steamship Company.

Goodall, Nelson and Perkins controlled much of the shipping industry from Alaska to Mexico during the mid 19th century.

Goodall served as harbormaster of San Francisco 1861-1865 and then served in the California State Assembly 8th District 1871–1873.

Goodall is buried in Mountain View Cemetery in Oakland, California. Serena M. Goodall (1832–1893), whose marker includes "Wife of Charles Goodall" is also buried there.

Charles Goodall Lee was named in honor of Charles Miner Goodall. Charles Goodall Lee's mother was set free from a probable life of slavery in California by Charles Miner Goodall at the area of Monterey, California at a Methodist site.

References

External links
 mountainviewpeople.blogspot.com
 maritimeheritage.org

1824 births
1899 deaths
Chinese-American history
English emigrants to the United States
Members of the California State Assembly
19th-century American politicians
Stanford University trustees
Burials at Mountain View Cemetery (Oakland, California)